Liberty X (originally called Liberty) are a British-Irish group originally consisting of Michelle Heaton, Tony Lundon, Kevin Simm, Jessica Taylor and Kelli Young. The group was formed by the five finalists of the 2001 ITV talent show Popstars who failed to make it into the winning group Hear'Say.

The group released their debut album, Thinking It Over, on 27 May 2002 which featured their biggest single "Just a Little", which gave them international success. They released their second studio album Being Somebody a year later on 3 November 2003, although not matching the success of their debut. Following disappointing sales, the group were dropped and later signed with Virgin, released a final studio album X on 10 October 2005 and disbanded in 2007. Liberty X went on to achieve ten consecutive UK Top 20 singles, and various charting singles worldwide, leading to greater commercial success than Hear'Say.

In 2013 Liberty X returned for the ITV2 documentary series The Big Reunion and toured until 2014. Since 2017, Heaton, Taylor and Young have performed as a girls trio.

History

2000–2001: Popstars, formation and name change
While the five winning contestants of Popstars formed Hear'Say, the five runner-up contestants—Michelle Heaton, Tony Lundon, Kevin Simm, Jessica Taylor and Kelli Young—formed the group Liberty. The name Liberty was chosen to reflect the freedom the members experienced following their participation in Popstars. Amidst pejorative media commentary (including the term "Flopstars"), the act signed a multi-million-pound record contract with Richard Branson's independent record label, V2 Records.

Shortly after forming, Liberty received a legal challenge in the UK High Court from a funk R&B band, also called "Liberty", who achieved success in the 1990s, including being awarded Capital Radio Band of the Year, playing Wembley Arena, European tours and the release of albums in the USA, Europe and UK. The original Liberty claimed that the newly formed Liberty was taking advantage of the goodwill that had been created by the former's success (known in English law as the "tort of passing off"). The final judgment was in favour of the funk R&B band and the ex-Popstars then asked readers of UK tabloid newspaper The Sun to suggest a new name. The winning name was "X Liberty", but the group used the entry as the basis for the official title, Liberty X.

2001–2002: Thinking It Over and touring
On 24 September 2001, whilst the group were known as Liberty, they released their debut single, "Thinking It Over". It was an instant hit, reaching number five on the UK Singles Chart; the single's physical release featured remixes by the Wideboys and Boy George. The follow-up single, "Doin' It", released on 3 December 2001, peaked at number fourteen. Following a five-month gap, in which the band were involved with the High Court dispute regarding their original name, their third single, "Just a Little", was released. That song reached number one in the UK and became the ninth best-selling single of 2002, as well as becoming a top ten hit in several other countries. It was also the fifth most played song on the radio of the 2000s.

"Just a Little" preceded the release of Liberty X's debut album, Thinking It Over (originally called To Those Who Wait). The album reached number three on the UK Albums Chart, eventually selling over one million copies worldwide. Two more hit singles were released from the album, the first being a cover of the 1989 track by electro funk group Mantronix, "Got To Have Your Love"; Mantronix's founding member, Kurtis Mantronik, remixed the Liberty X version for the single release, which peaked at number two in the UK. The final single was "Holding on for You", released in December 2002. The single peaked at number five. During 2002, the group headlined their first arena tour.

2003–2005: Being Somebody and record label change
Following a short break, the group released "Being Nobody", a mash-up of Chaka Khan's "Ain't Nobody" and The Human League's "Being Boiled". The single was produced by Richard X and released under the billing of Richard X vs Liberty X, featured on Richard X's album Richard X Presents His X-Factor Vol. 1. "Being Nobody" reached number three on the UK singles chart. Proceeding their second album, Being Somebody, the group released "Jumpin", which peaked at number six. Being Somebody was released in November 2003, debuting at number twelve on the UK albums chart, but sold around 200,000 copies, significantly less than sales of their debut. The group released the album's final single, "Everybody Cries", in January 2004. The music video featured the group walking along disused railway lines, for which they were criticised by safety organisations. The single underperformed, reaching number thirteen.

The group took a hiatus following record-label issues, and each member decided to work on different individual projects. Kevin Simm appeared on Channel 4's The Games, competing in a series of sporting events (in which he placed second overall, behind Philip Olivier). Michelle Heaton appeared on ITV's ill-fated Celebrity Wrestling. Jessica Taylor appeared on BBC's Strictly Ice Dancing. Tony Lundon and Kelli Young took the time to work on new tracks for the band's third album, whilst producing and writing for other artists. During this period, The Sun newspaper reported that the group were to re-release Being Somebody with a cover of the 1990 hit "Back to Life", but this never materialised. They also released a cover version of the Kool & The Gang song "Fresh" which was released in a selection of European countries, but not the UK. It peaked at number 35 in France.

2005–2007: X and split
In mid-2005, it was announced that Liberty X had left V2 Records and signed to independent label Unique Corp Records. Their third album, X, was released in October 2005. The first single, "Song 4 Lovers" (featuring Rev Run of Run–D.M.C., who also co-wrote the track), had been recorded when they were signed to V2, but they re-recorded it because V2 did not consider the song suitable as a Liberty X single. It was released in September 2005 and was well-received, achieving a large amount of television and radio airplay; it entered the UK charts at number five to become their first top ten hit in two years. X, however, peaked at number 27, failing to match the success of "Song 4 Lovers", and sold just 10,000 copies in the UK.

In late October, the group announced they had been asked to record the official 2005 Children in Need single, so they teamed up with producer Rod Gammons to record two tracks for double A-side release: "A Night to Remember" (a cover of the Shalamar song) and "Everybody Dance" (a (Chic cover). The group performed both singles live on the night, 18 November 2005. The double A-side single entered at number six in the UK; it also peaked at number 16 in France, becoming their biggest hit there since "Just a Little".

In May 2006, the band were featured in the line up of Aberystwyth University May ball, alongside Chesney Hawkes and BodyRockers. Their set was cut short when a smoke bomb was set off during the first two minutes, filling the room with smoke. Firefighters gave the all-clear after 50 minutes, but Liberty X failed to reappear. Students were told the band were not returning to finish their set, met by jeers from the crowd, who had paid £37 each for the evening.

Liberty X returned in June 2006 with the single "X", a remixed version of the X album track. It peaked at number 47. The re-release of the album, which contains "A Night to Remember" and the new version of "X", failed to attract significant consumer interest. "X" also reached just number 89 in France. Despite rumours of splitting, Liberty X announced in 2006 that they were still together but concentrating on solo projects. Michelle Heaton wrote on the group's official site that they would be releasing a new single in the new year (2007), a song from a forthcoming film, but this did not happen. Heaton married her partner of four years, Andy Scott-Lee, Taylor got engaged to cricket star Kevin Pietersen, Simm appeared on Channel 4's The Games: Champion of Champions (competing for his team), and Lundon wrote tracks for what would have been the band's fourth album. On 20 May 2007, Liberty X posted a message on their website that said they would no longer record together after the tour:

The group performed their last gig on 2 September 2007, alongside Liz McClarnon, Lisa Scott-Lee and Stonefoxx at the Wiltshire Crime Stoppers charity event held in the grounds of Bowood House, near Chippenham in Wiltshire. The band reunited in August 2008 to perform at Belfast's gay pride celebrations, the first time they had been on stage together in over a year.

2012–2014: Full members reunion
On 18 October 2012, it was announced that Liberty X, along with five other pop groups of their time – B*Witched, Honeyz, 911, Five and Atomic Kitten – would reunite for an ITV2 series called The Big Reunion, in which they would reveal about their individual stories about their life in the band before reforming for a gig at the Hammersmith Apollo, singing their greatest hits. The show, which aired from 31 January to 28 March 2013, followed the groups rehearsing for two weeks ahead of one major comeback performance at the London Hammersmith Apollo on 26 February.

Tickets for the Hammersmith Apollo reunion gig went on sale shortly after the premiere of the first episode of The Big Reunion and sold out in less than five minutes. Due to this, it was confirmed that a full UK tour was in the works, later confirmed again by Heaton on her Twitter account. The bands were originally only supposed to perform a one-off concert at London's Hammersmith Apollo on 26 February 2013, but when the entire show sold out in under five minutes shortly after the premiere of the first episode on 31 January 2013, rumours circulated that producers of the show were planning to tour the concert around the UK. On 11 February, it was confirmed that due to high demands for tickets and the popularity of the show, an arena tour around the UK would be taking place from 3–12 May 2013. On 27 March 2013 it was announced that the bands would perform a mini Christmas tour in December 2013.

On 29 March 2013, Heaton confirmed that Liberty X would yet again disband following the concerts, saying: "We talked about it, and we thought we've got so many children between us and quite a few things individually going on that we didn't want the pressure to be successful again. We just wanted to have fun. I know some of the other bands are planning to release new material but Liberty X, we are not planning to do that. We are just enjoying it for what it is. We're going to enjoy the gigs, all the performing and have fun and not take it too seriously – and know at the end, we go back to being mums and dads to our children. That's how it's different." Whilst on Lorraine on 12 September, however, Heaton said, "When we filmed [The Big Reunion: On Tour] in May, we said 'no' and we said we weren't going to do anything, but because we love it so much, I'd like to say 'never say never'. So maybe ask me again after Christmas." The group performed their final gig together on 15 December 2013.

In 2014, Liberty X signed to 365 Artists Management and toured at the Summer Tour. In 2016, Simm auditioned for the fifth series of The Voice UK, making it clear that he left Liberty X as he felt they were officially over since 2014. He was mentored by coach Ricky Wilson and subsequently won the competition.

2017–present: Girls reunion
In 2017, Heaton, Taylor and Young reformed Liberty X as a three-piece girl group and have continued touring at music festivals and Pride events.

Solo careers
Michelle Heaton has been on several reality shows, one of them being Come Dine with Me in 2009, alongside ex-rival Lee Ryan from boy band Blue. She appeared on the sixth series of Celebrity Big Brother the same year, where she was the third celebrity to be evicted. Heaton has also appeared frequently in best friend Katie Price's TV shows on ITV2. In July 2010, she married for the second time to her partner of two years, Hugh Hanley. In July 2011 it was announced that Michelle was expecting the couple's first child. On 12 January 2012, she gave birth to Faith Michelle Hanley. In September 2013, she announced that she was pregnant with her second child, a boy.
Tony Lundon has presented the "TOAST" quiz series on The Den on RTÉ Two on Saturday mornings and also produced and promoted an Irish music and sport live event series in London known as The Big Shindigs. In 2010 he moved to New York City to study film and returned to the UK in 2012 to establish a film, TV and music production company, The Cell Productions. With The Cell, Tony produced and directed a short film for The Scout Association which has become their most watched worldwide and has since aired across the Discovery Network channels in the UK He also directed a short featuring Oscar nominee Sir Terence Stamp and James Bond alumnus, Colin Salmon.
Kevin Simm, focusing on his solo career, created his own Myspace music profile, uploading demo tracks for his fans to hear his progress as a solo artist. In a March 2008 interview with Gordon McCully, he stated, "I've been very busy in the studio recording new solo tracks which I'll hopefully be able to share with people very soon." Simm has signed to JamDown Music, where his track "Brand New" is featured on their official website's music player. On 3 October 2008, Kevin's debut album, titled Brand New, was released in Japan. The album has since appeared for purchase on iTunes. In January 2016, he was selected during The Voice UK's Blind Auditions and went on to win. In 2018, Simm became the lead singer of the Scottish band Wet Wet Wet. He replaced founding member and former leader vocalist Marti Pellow, who departed from the band in 2017.
Jessica Taylor took part in BBC's one-off Strictly Ice Dancing in 2005 and came in second place. She also participated in the fourth series of Dancing on Ice, partnered with Pavel Aubrecht in 2009. They made it to the final, finishing in third place. Taylor subsequently toured with Torvill and Dean on their 25th Anniversary Bolero Tour, performing in arenas across the UK. She was signed in 2009 as the face and body of 'Diamond Boutique' lingerie by Ultimo. Taylor married former England cricketer Kevin Pietersen in 2007. They have two children; a boy named Dylan and a girl named Rosie.
Kelli Young kept quiet after the band split. She starred in the ITV show Britain Sings Christmas in 2007, performing a cover version of Mariah Carey's "All I Want for Christmas Is You".

Discography

 Thinking It Over (2002)
 Being Somebody (2003)
 X (2005)

Concert tours
Headlining
 Just a Little Tour (2002–2003)
 Being Somebody Tour (2003–2004)
 The X Tour (2006)
 Summer Tour (2014)
 Liberty X Live (2017–present)

Co-headlining
 Popstar Tour (2001) 
 The Big Reunion (2013)

References

 
Brit Award winners
English pop music groups
British contemporary R&B musical groups
Musical groups established in 2001
Musical groups disestablished in 2007
Musical groups reestablished in 2013